Lemire is a surname. Notable people with the surname include:

Chris Lemire (born 1983), Canadian soccer player
Clarence P. LeMire (1886–1961), judge of the United States Tax Court
Jeff Lemire (born 1976), Canadian cartoonist
Maxim Lemire (born 1982), Canadian strongman and professional wrestler
Alexxis Lemire (born 1996), American actress and model